Lovers & Leavers is a 2002 Finnish romantic drama film directed by Aku Louhimies. The film is written by Katja Kallio and Louhimies, based on Kallio's novel Kuutamolla: Levoton tarina rakastamisesta. Lovers & Leavers is about Iiris, a 30-year-old bookstore assistant, who meets the man of her dreams.

Cast 
 Minna Haapkylä as Iiris Vaara
 Anna-Leena Härkönen as Anna
 Laura Malmivaara as Laura
 Peter Franzén as Marko
 Matti Ristinen as Sami
 Mikko Kouki as Jukka
 Pirkko Saisio as Leila Vaara
 Santeri Nuutinen as Santtu
 Rasmus Nuutinen as Tintti
 Veeti Kallio as Mikko
 Linda Zilliacus as Ilona

Awards 
Cinequest San Jose Film Festival

|-
| 2003|| Lovers & Leavers || Best Feature || 
|}

Durango Film Festival

|-
| 2003|| Lovers & Leavers || Jury Award in category Best Narrative Feature - Drama || 
|}

Jussi Awards

|-
| 2003|| Lovers & Leavers || Best Actress (Paras naispääosa)Best Editing (Paras leikkaus)Best Film (Vuoden elokuva)Best Set Design (Paras lavastus)Best Supporting Actress (Paras naissivuosa) || 
|}

References

External links 
 

2002 romantic drama films
2002 films
Films directed by Aku Louhimies
Films set in Helsinki
Films set in the 2000s
Films shot in Finland
Films based on Finnish novels
Finnish romantic drama films
2000s Finnish-language films